La Sagra's flycatcher (Myiarchus sagrae) is a passerine bird in the tyrant flycatcher family.

It breeds on Cuba, the Bahamas and Grand Cayman in the West Indies. It is normally a year-round resident, but has been known as an occasional vagrant to southern Florida.

Its natural habitats are subtropical or tropical moist lowland forests, subtropical or tropical mangrove forests, subtropical or tropical moist montane forests, and heavily degraded former forest. The nest is built in a tree cavity or similar natural or man-made hole, and the normal clutch is two to four eggs.

Adult La Sagra's flycatchers are 19–22 cm long and weigh 17-21 g. The upperparts are olive brown, with a darker head and short crest. The breast is grey and the belly is a dull white. The brown tail feathers and wings have rufous outer webs, and there are two dull wing bars. The sexes are similar.

La Sagra's flycatcher is separated from other confusingly similar Myiarchus species by its call, a high pitched single or double noted wink.

This species is primarily an insectivore which catches its prey by flycatching amongst the undergrowth, but will also take berries and seeds.

References

La Sagra's flycatcher
Birds of Cuba
Birds of the Bahamas
Birds of the Cayman Islands
Endemic birds of the Caribbean
La Sagra's flycatcher